The Protected Disclosures Act 2000 is a piece of New Zealand legislation regarding the disclosures, in the public interest, of serious wrongdoing (sometimes called 'whistle-blowing'). The Act promotes the public interest by setting out procedures to be followed when making a disclosure, and provides protection to employees who make disclosures, in accordance with the Act.

External links
Text of the Act
Office of the Ombudsmen's guide to the Protected Disclosures Act

Statutes of New Zealand
2000 in New Zealand law
Whistleblower protection legislation